The Tourist Church, also known as the Seabreeze United Church of Christ and the First Congregational Church, is an historic church located at 501 North Wild Olive Avenue in Daytona Beach, Florida, United States. Built in 1929, it was designed by architect Harry Griffin in the Mission Revival Style of architecture.

Today it is an active United Church of Christ congregation. The Rev. Don Epps is its current pastor.

On October 6, 1995, it was added to the National Register of Historic Places.

References

External links

Seabreeze United Church of Christ official website
Volusia County listings at National Register of Historic Places

Buildings and structures in Daytona Beach, Florida
Churches in Volusia County, Florida
National Register of Historic Places in Volusia County, Florida
Churches on the National Register of Historic Places in Florida
United Church of Christ churches in Florida
1929 establishments in Florida
Churches completed in 1929